Evergreen School District No. 50 is the public school district for Evergreen, Montana.  The school district occupies three buildings.

East Evergreen Elementary School is located at 585 East Evergreen Drive, approximately one mile east of Highway 2.  The school serves Kindergarten through Fourth grade students.  The school has four Kindergarten classes, four First grade classes, four Second grade classes, three Third grade classes, and four Fourth grade classes.  The school also has a library, gymnasium facility, music room, computer lab, and two special education classes for students of various needs.  The east school site comprises 8.12 acres.

Evergreen Junior High School (Grades 5 - 8) is near the administration building at the corner of Highway 2 and West Evergreen Drive.  The junior high school site consists of 20.94 acres.

The administration building is located at 18 West Evergreen Drive, Kalispell, Montana.

External links
 Evergreen School District No. 50

School districts in Montana
Education in Flathead County, Montana